Ōtara-Papatoetoe is a local government area in Auckland, in New Zealand's Auckland Region. It is governed by the Ōtara-Papatoetoe Local Board and Auckland Council. It is within the council's Manukau Ward.

Geography

The area includes the suburbs of main suburbs of Otara and Papatoetoe, and the neighbouring suburbs of Manukau, Middlemore and  Clover Park.

Features

Features in the area include:

 Middlemore Hospital
 Ōtara Shopping Centre
 Manukau Institute of Technology South Campus
 Puhinui Reserve
 Grange Golf Club
 Auckland Golf Club

References